Moon Over Morocco is a 1974 radio drama, the second in ZBS's Jack Flanders series. Originally broadcast as fifty twelve-minute episodes, the serial was written and directed by Meatball Fulton.

History
Following on the success of The Fourth Tower of Inverness, Fulton set about working on a sequel in 1973. Fulton described the story "a mystery fantasy with a whiff of 'Casablanca' about it". It  was set in Morocco where he spent a month recording ambient sounds and music for the production. Fulton stayed with the writer Paul Bowles in Tangier and learned about Moroccan magic practices from him. 

Fulton recorded location sound throughout Morocco, including the courtyard of Bowles' villa in Marrakech. The production also used traditional Moroccan music recorded by Bowles for the festival scenes. The recordings helped inspire his writing, Fulton told Billboard magazine. "It's so real, you'll even be able to smell the flowers and spice and dry earth of Morocco. Ah, yes. Escapism at its finest," he said.

Synopsis

Jack Flanders arrives in Tangier on a search for sites that lie along "ley lines", undercurrents of mystical energy described in ancient texts. He meets Kasbah Kelly, an expatriate bar owner, and Kelly's assistant Mojo Sam and befriends one of the bar's customers, Sunny Skies. He also visits the Comtese Zazeenia, an expatriate holdover from Morocco's French colonial days and an old enemy of Kelly's.

Strange events begin to occur: Jack is pursued by owls, his hotel room crumbles away as the hotel disintegrates around him and a mysterious woman named Layla Oolupi warns him to leave Morocco immediately. Refusing to heed her warning, Jack instead travels to a music festival in Marrakech with Kelly and Sunny. Caught up in a traditional dance, Jack begins to disappear into an invisible world straight out of Moroccan legend. This first night, Kelly tackles him and prevents his disappearance, but the next night, Jack succeeds in completing the transition into the land of legend. Kelly's intervention causes Jack to (seemingly) split into two rival figures in this alternate world, a usurper Emperor (Hassan Bizel) and an upstart claimant to the throne, known as the Son of El Kabah.

Kelly, Mojo and Sunny search for Jack in our world, while the two Jacks confront one another after the "Son of el Kabah" completes a long journey through the Sahara desert, accompanied by Little Flossic (revisiting the "Little Frieda" role of The Fourth Tower of Inverness).

Music
In the series there are some musical interludes, including:
"You Go to My Head" and "Black Forrest" from Black Forrest – Jimmy Forrest
"The Riff Song," "The Desert Song," and other songs from The Desert Song – Gordon MacRae, Dorothy Kirsten, and cast
"Something Fine" – Jackson Browne

Credits
Cast
 Jack Flanders / King Hassan Bizel / El Kabah - Robert Lorick
 Kasbah Kelly / The Gate Keeper - Robert Lesser
 Mojo Sam, the Yoodoo Man - Dave Adams
 Little Flossic - P.J. Orte (Billed as Spooner Duffy)
 Sunny Skies / Fatma Tajhem - Lee Berg
 Layla Oolupi - Chitra Neogy
 Queen Azora - Jane Traum
 Narrator / Grand Wazir - Dave Herman
 Storyteller Mustafa - Taurean Blacque
 Comtese Zazeenia - Valerie Mamches
 Abu - Meatball Fulton
 Taxi Driver - Mad Max
 Marmaduke - Michael Roach
 Others: Gail Turner, Bill Moskowitz, Richard Shanks, Charlotte Mason & Mark Stone

Crew
 Mojo's Piano - The Incomparable George Schutz
 Incidental Music - Randy Cohen, Dennis Colin
 Additional Music - Tim Clark
 Producer / Director - Tom Lopez
 Story & Script - Meatball Fulton
 Engineer - Bobby Bielecki
 Front Illustration - David Byrd
 Back Illustration - Alan Okamoto
 Moroccan environments recorded by M. Fulton
 Moroccan Music recorded by Paul Bowles

Production was made possible by Robert Durand. CD pressing made possible by John Romkey.

References

External links
 ZBS Foundation

American radio dramas
ZBS Foundation